Michaelia Clare Cash (born 19 July 1970) is an Australian politician who served as the 38th Attorney-General of Australia from 2021 to 2022 in the Morrison Government. She has been a Senator for Western Australia since 2008 and is a member of the Liberal Party of Australia.

As well as being Attorney-General in the Morrison government, Cash also served as Minister for Industrial Relations from 2021 to 2022, and Minister for Employment, Skills, Small and Family Business and Minister for Small and Family Business, Skills and Vocational Education from 2018 to 2021. Previously, she served in the Turnbull government as the Minister for Jobs and Innovation from 2017 to 2018 and Minister for Employment and Minister for Women from 2015 to 2017.

Early life
Cash was born on 19 July 1970 in Subiaco, Western Australia. She is one of four children born to Ursula Clare Yelland and Samuel Ernest "George" Cash. Her father, the owner of a construction company, was elected to state parliament in 1984 and served as President of the Western Australian Legislative Council. Cash grew up in the Perth suburb of Mount Lawley. She was educated at Iona Presentation College, a Catholic school in Mosman Park.

Cash graduated from Curtin University in 1990 with a Bachelor of Arts with a triple major in public relations, politics, and journalism. She also holds an Honours Degree in Law from the University of London and a Graduate Diploma in Legal Practice from the University of Western Australia. After graduating from Curtin she spent three years backpacking overseas, travelling through Israel, Egypt and Turkey.

Cash joined the Liberal Party in 1988. She was an executive member of the Curtin University Young Liberals from 1988 to 1990 and then the Western Australian Young Liberal Movement where she held numerous positions including State Vice-President. She was a long-time member of the Liberal Party of Western Australia's State Council and was the President of the Moore Division. She has also served on the Party's state executive.

Prior to her political career, Cash was a solicitor with the law firm Freehills where she worked from 1999 to 2008. She practised in all areas of employment and industrial law including industrial relations, employee relations, occupational health and safety, equal opportunity, executive employment and unfair dismissal.

Political career
Cash won preselection for the Liberal Party Senate ticket in 2007 and went on to be elected to the Federal Parliament at the 2007 federal election. She contested the election as the number three candidate of the Liberal Senate ticket in Western Australia.

Since entering Federal Parliament Cash has served on many Senate Committees and was also a Temporary Chair of Committees between February and September 2010. In September 2010, while in opposition, Cash was promoted to the positions of Shadow Parliamentary Secretary for the Status of Women and the Shadow Parliamentary Secretary for Immigration. At this time Cash was also appointed Deputy Manager of Opposition Business in the Senate.

After the election of the Abbott Government in September 2013, Cash was sworn in as the Assistant Minister for Immigration and Border Protection, as well as the Minister Assisting the Prime Minister for Women. Following a leadership change that led to the formation of the Turnbull Government, Cash was sworn in on 21 September 2015 as the Minister for Employment, the Minister for Women, and the Minister Assisting the Prime Minister on the Public Service.

In October 2017, the Australian Workers' Union offices were raided by the Australian Federal Police, and media were tipped off prior to the event.  Cash advised the Senate Estimates that a staffer of hers found out about the raid from "a media source" and then spread the word to more journalists, having previously denied to an Estimates hearing on the previous day that her office had any involvement. The staffer in question resigned. Cash was ordered to turn over documents in her department relating to the raid. Cash's legal fees for her response to a federal court subpoena were paid for through taxpayer funding. The raids were eventually held to be valid by the Full Federal Court in November 2020.

In a December 2017 ministerial reshuffle, Cash was appointed to the new position of Minister for Jobs and Innovation. The employment portfolio was abolished, while Kelly O'Dwyer assumed responsibility for both the Women and Public Service portfolios.

Cash has been criticised for refusing to release a report into an 18-year-old who died while on a Work for the Dole assignment in April 2016.  At the time, Cash promised to release the report within a month, as of April 2018 the final report was not completed, and an internal report to Cash completed in September 2016 had not been released.

Cash offered her resignation from the frontbench on 22 August 2018, during the events of the Liberal Party of Australia leadership spill, 2018. Scott Morrison replaced Turnbull as Prime Minister two days later on 24 August 2018. Cash was then appointed the Minister for Small and Family Business, Skills and Vocational Education in the First Morrison Ministry.

In the Second Morrison Ministry, Cash was appointed the Minister for Employment, Skills, Small and Family Business in May 2019. In October 2020, she was additionally appointed the Deputy Leader of the Government in the Senate.

On 29 March 2021, it was announced that Cash would be appointed as Attorney-General and Minister for Industrial Relations in a cabinet reshuffle replacing Christian Porter. She was sworn in the following day.

Cash is a member of the National Right faction of the Liberal Party.

Personal life
Cash is married to Richard Price, a barrister. They met while working together at the same law firm. Price is the brother of late political journalist Matt Price.

Cash was diagnosed with rheumatoid arthritis at the age of 25, which progressed into psoriatic arthritis and ankylosing spondylitis. She was unable to have children due to the associated medication, and "also never wanted to risk passing on a chronic illness to another person".

See also
Abbott Ministry
First Turnbull Ministry
Second Turnbull Ministry
First Morrison Ministry
Second Morrison Ministry

Notes

References

External links
 Senator Cash's first speech
 Summary of parliamentary voting for Senator Michaelia Cash on TheyVoteForYou.org.au

1970 births
Living people
21st-century Australian politicians
21st-century Australian women politicians
Abbott Government
Alumni of the University of London
Curtin University alumni
Female justice ministers
Government ministers of Australia
Liberal Party of Australia members of the Parliament of Australia
Members of the Australian Senate
Members of the Australian Senate for Western Australia
Members of the Cabinet of Australia
Morrison Government
Turnbull Government
University of Western Australia alumni
Women government ministers of Australia
Women members of the Australian Senate